Holthausen is a locality in the municipality Schmallenberg in the High Sauerland District in North Rhine-Westphalia, Germany.

Holthausen borders on the villages of Bad Fredeburg, Gleidorf, Huxel, Rellmecke, Niedersorpe and Winkhausen.

The village used to belong to the municipality of Oberkirchen in Amt Schmallenberg until the end of 1974.

Gallery

External links 
Holthausen-Huxel.de

References

Villages in North Rhine-Westphalia
Schmallenberg